The Bengaluru–Mumbai Industrial Corridor (BMIC) is a proposed economic corridor in India between Mumbai and Bangalore. The corridor is spread across the states of Karnataka and Maharashtra and passes through major cities such as Davanagere, Chitradurga, Hubli–Dharwad, Belagavi, Solapur, Kolhapur, Satara and Pune. The overall length of the corridor is around 1,000 km and covers an area of around 143,000 km2. The corridor is delineated around the existing National Highway 48 (NH48) (which connects Bangalore to Mumbai), the existing Bangalore-Mumbai railway line and the Dabhol–Bangalore Natural Gas Pipeline.

During the India–United Kingdom summit in November 2013, the Indian and British governments agreed to undertake a joint feasibility study on the project. The DMICDC and the UK Trade and Investment (UKTI) were appointed as the nodal agencies for the project, representing the two sides respectively. The DMICDC floated a tender to appoint a consultant for the project in November 2013, awarded the contract to a joint venture between Egis India Consulting Engineers Pvt. Ltd., ile-de-France and CRISIL Risk & Infrastructure Solutions Limited on 14 February 2014. The feasibility study was financed by the Government of India.

The government has envisaged at least four new cities to boost manufacturing activity across the corridor for which the detailed plan is yet to work out.

See also
 India's National Industrial Corridor Programme
 Amritsar–Delhi–Kolkata Industrial Corridor
 Chennai Bangalore Industrial Corridor
 Delhi–Mumbai Industrial Corridor Project.                                                                                                                     
 Visakhapatnam–Chennai Industrial Corridor
 Delhi–Saharanpur–Dehradun economic corridor
Economic corridor

References

Proposed infrastructure in Karnataka
Proposed infrastructure in Maharashtra
Economy of Maharashtra
Economy of Karnataka
Industrial corridors in India